Arturo Román is a fictional character in the Netflix series Money Heist, portrayed by Enrique Arce. He is a hostage in parts 1 and 2, having been the Director of the Royal Mint of Spain, before spinning his experience into a massively successful public speaking career. Years later, in part 3, he returns to being a hostage as part of a bigger plan to undermine the gang's new robbery at the Bank of Spain.

The character
In parts 1 and 2, Arturo is a major driving force of the hostages' opposition against their captors. He receives the nickname "Arturito" from Denver in the series' first episode, which sticks for the remainder of the series. Unhappy with his life after the assault on the Mint and longing to re-establish a relationship with his former mistress Mónica, Arturo takes measures to become a hostage again during the Bank of Spain heist in part 3.

As he was focused on his acting career in the United States, Arce was originally not interested in auditioning for the role of Arturo, whom he considered "a disgusting guy". He decided otherwise after seeing a lottery advertisement as a sign and because Arturo's arc was intended to be short-lived, with the character supposed to die after the sixth episode. Brazilian magazine Veja described the character as "loved by some and hated by others (and probably much more hated)", and Marco Almodóvar of El Economista found Arturo "a bit unbearable" at first and later a fan favorite, so the creators opted to have part 3 open with Arturo as a hero. Arce attributed this change in audience perception to the comic relief the character provides, despite contributing little to the story. Guillermo Courau of La Nación named Arturo in part 3 a prime example for the part's unnecessary substories that break the rhythm, and assumed that the character was only brought over to please fans.

Arturo Román is also a character in Elvira Lindo's series of children's novels "Manolito Gafotas". He is Manolito's classmate.

References

External links
 Arturo Román on IMDb

Money Heist characters
Male characters in television
Television characters introduced in 2017
Fictional rapists
Fictional Spanish people